Attila Kámán, (born November 20, 1969) is a Hungarian footballer, who played as a forward.

Club career
He played for Jeju United of the South Korean K League, then known as Yukong Elephant.

References

External links
 

1969 births
Living people
Hungarian footballers
Zalaegerszegi TE players
Budapest Honvéd FC players
BFC Siófok players
Csepel SC footballers
Hévíz FC footballers
K League 1 players
Jeju United FC players
Hungarian expatriate footballers
Hungarian expatriate sportspeople in South Korea
Expatriate footballers in South Korea
Hungary international footballers
Association football forwards